Leucorhynchia punctata is a species of sea snail, a marine gastropod mollusk in the family Skeneidae.

Description
The shell has a diameter of 2.5 mm. The solid, yellowish white, subtranslucent shell has a depressed convex shape. It is more flattened below. The umbilicus is almost covered. The surface is covered by microscopic, close granular spiral striae, more apparent at the suture and around the umbilicus.

Distribution
This species occurs in the Atlantic Ocean off Angola, São Tomé and Príncipe, Ghana and Guinea.

References

 Jousseaume, F. (1872). Etude des genres Teinostoma, Cyclostrema et Skenea. Revue et Magasin de Zoologie. ser. 2, 23: 388-396.

External links
  Dautzenberg P. (1912) Mission Gruvel sur la côte occidentale d'Afrique (1909-1910): Mollusques marins. Annales de l'Institut Océanographique, Paris, (Nouvelle Série) 5(3): 1-111, pl. 1-3.

punctata
Gastropods described in 1872
Molluscs of the Atlantic Ocean
Molluscs of Angola